Ágnes Bánfalvy (born 30 April 1954) is a Hungarian actress. She appeared in more than fifty films since 1975.

Selected filmography

External links
 

1954 births
Living people
Actresses from Budapest
Hungarian film actresses
Hungarian television actresses